Andrea Dini (born 20 February 1996) is an Italian footballer who plays as a goalkeeper for  club Crotone.

Career

Rimini
He is the product of Rimini and started making bench appearances for the senior squad in the 2012–13 season of Lega Pro Seconda Divisione at the age of 16. After the reorganization of Italian lower-leagues system Rimini was moved to Serie D and he became the first-choice goalkeeper for the club in the 2014–15 season.

Loan to San Marino
On 24 July 2015, he joined San Marino, also in the Serie D, on a season-long loan.

Messina
On 20 July 2016, he joined Messina. However, he left the club just a month later without appearing in any competitive games.

Return to San Marino
He returned to San Marino on 1 September 2016 on a permanent basis.

Parma
On 1 August 2017, he signed a two-year contract with Serie B club Parma. He was the backup for the whole 2017–18 season to Pierluigi Frattali, not making any league appearances.

Loan to Trapani
On 10 August 2018, he joined Trapani in Serie C on a season-long loan. He made his Serie C debut for Trapani on 18 September 2018 in a game against Reggina.

Trapani was promoted to Serie B and the loan was renewed for another season on 29 July 2019. He made his Serie B debut on 24 August 2019 in a game against Ascoli. After starting Trapani's first three games in Serie B, he lost his starting position to Marco Carnesecchi.

Loan to Avellino 
On 24 January 2020 he moved on loan to Serie C club Avellino.

Loan to Padova 
On 1 February 2021 he was loaned to Padova in Serie C.

Serie C clubs 
On 30 August 2021, he signed with Fidelis Andria. On 24 January 2022, he moved to Juve Stabia. On 18 July 2022, Dini signed a two-year contract with Crotone.

References

External links
 

1996 births
Living people
Sportspeople from the Province of Rimini
Footballers from Emilia-Romagna
Italian footballers
Association football goalkeepers
Serie B players
Serie C players
Serie D players
Rimini F.C. 1912 players
A.S.D. Victor San Marino players
A.C.R. Messina players
Parma Calcio 1913 players
Trapani Calcio players
U.S. Avellino 1912 players
Calcio Padova players
S.S. Fidelis Andria 1928 players
S.S. Juve Stabia players
F.C. Crotone players
Italian expatriate footballers
Italian expatriate sportspeople in San Marino
Expatriate footballers in San Marino